Barbie and the Secret Door is a 2014 computer-animated musical fantasy film. It was released to DVD on September 16, 2014, and made its television premiere on Nickelodeon on November 23, 2014.

This film is the 28th entry in the Barbie film series. It was directed by Karen Lloyd and features the voice of Kelly Sheridan as Princess Alexa, a shy princess who discovers a secret door in her kingdom and enters a whimsical land filled with magical creatures.

Plot
Set in a modern-day kingdom, Alexa is a shy, book-reading princess who avoids doing the duties expected of her due to her rank. In order to encourage her, Alexa's grandmother gives her a storybook about a princess who discovers she has magic. While reading the book, Alexa discovers a mysterious door in the royal gardens. She enters the door and finds herself in a fantasy land.

Alexa meets Nori, a fairy missing her wings, and Romy, a mermaid with legs instead of her tail. Nori and Romy are thrilled because as a princess, Alexa can perform magic with a wand. Their realm is under threat by the mean, mischievous Princess Malucia, a spoiled child princess who was born without magic and has been taking it by force from all the creatures she can capture. Alexa is brought to the glade where fairies, mermaids and unicorns are hiding from Malucia. There, Alexa slowly learns to use her wand. However, she cannot return Nori and Romy to their original forms, because their magic is trapped in Malucia's scepter.

The group learn that Malucia is trying to find the Queen Unicorn, who is the most magical creature in the realm. Alexa, Nori, and Romy travel to the Queen Unicorn, hoping to protect her, only to unintentionally lead Malucia and her minions right to her. Malucia captures the Queen Unicorn, while Nori and Romy provide a distraction so that Alexa can escape. While fleeing, Alexa discovers the doorway back to her world but decides to stay and help.

Alexa, Nori, and Romy go to Malucia's palace, where they witness Malucia draining all the unicorns' magic into her scepter. Alexa confronts Malucia, declaring that she is a princess, too, which provokes Malucia into a magical battle to "prove" who is the better princess. During the fight, Alexa realizes that Malucia's scepter is cracking under its magical content. Alexa willingly lets Malucia steal all her magic, which causes Malucia's scepter to explode, releasing all its magic. Malucia is harmless once again, and Alexa, who can now perform magic without a wand, returns all the magic to their rightful owners.

After promising to visit again soon, Alexa returns to her kingdom more confident, and more willing to participate in her princess duties. As for Malucia, her parents return from their holiday and scold her for trying to take over the kingdom again.

Voice cast
Voice cast as listed in the closing credits:

Soundtrack
A soundtrack for the film was released on August 25, 2014, a week after the film's release on video. The soundtrack's track list is as follows:

 "What's Gonna Happen" – Brittany McDonald (Alexa)
 "If I Had Magic" – Brittany McDonald (Alexa)
 "Magic Door" (Score)
 "You're Here" – Ashleigh Ball (Nori) and Chanelle Peloso (Romy)
 "I Want it All" – Tabitha St. Germain (Malucia)
 "I've Got Magic" – Brittany McDonald (Alexa)
 "Unicorn" (Score)
 "We've Got Magic" – Ashleigh Ball (Nori) and Chanelle Peloso (Romy)
 "Return to the Castle" (Score)
 "What's Gonna Happen" (Reprise) – Brittany McDonald (Alexa)

References

External links
 Barbie and the Secret Door at the Universal Pictures Home Entertainment portal
 

2014 direct-to-video films
2014 films
American direct-to-video films
Canadian direct-to-video films
2010s English-language films
2010s American animated films
2010s children's fantasy films
American children's animated fantasy films
2010s musical fantasy films
American musical fantasy films
Barbie films
Canadian animated feature films
Canadian musical fantasy films
Canadian independent films
Films set in Europe
Films set in a fictional country
Films set in the 2010s
Films set in 2014
Films set in the 21st century
Universal Pictures direct-to-video films
Universal Pictures direct-to-video animated films
2010s Canadian films